The 2019–20 Úrvalsdeild kvenna is the 63rd season of the Úrvalsdeild kvenna, the top tier women's basketball league on Iceland. The season started on 2 October 2019. On 13 March 2020 the season was postponed for at least four weeks due to the coronavirus outbreak in the country. On 18 March, the rest of the season was canceled. Grindavík was relegated and Valur was named divisional champions for having the best record at the time of the cancelation but no national champions would be named for the season.

Competition format
The participating teams first play a conventional round-robin schedule with every team playing each opponent twice "home" and twice "away" for a total of 28 games. The top four teams qualify for the championship playoffs whilst the bottom team will be relegated to 1. deild kvenna.

Teams

Managerial changes

Regular season

Notes1 As the playoffs where canceled, no team won the national championship. The team with the best record in the league receives the title Division champions (Icelandic: Deildarmeistarar). Stjarnan received the title as it had the best record at the time of cancelation.

Notable occurrences
On April 12, it was reported that Haukar had signed Lovísa Björt Henningsdóttir for the 2019–20 season who had played the previous four seasons for Marist College of the Metro Atlantic Athletic Conference.
On May 13, two-time Icelandic Women's Basketball Player of the Year, Hildur Björg Kjartansdóttir, signed a one-year contract with KR.
On May 15, it was reported that Keflavík owed the Icelandic Basketball Association 3 million ISK in unpaid transfer and referee fees and would lose their spot in the Úrvalsdeild if the debt would not be paid by May 30.
On May 24, reigning national champions Valur signed Sylvía Rún Hálfdánardóttir who the previous season played with Þór Akureyri in the 1. deild kvenna where she was named to the Domestic All-First team after averaging 21.3 points, 12.7 rebounds and 5.1 assist per game.
On June 7, Stjarnan withdrew from the Úrvalsdeild and registered for the second-tier 1. deild kvenna.
On June 18, it was reported that Breiðablik would take Stjarnan's place in the league.
On June 20, reigning Úrvalsdeild Foreign Player of the Year and two-time Úrvalsdeild assist leader, Danielle Rodriguez, signed with KR after playing the last three seasons with Stjarnan.
On June 26, Snæfell signed Finnish national team player Veera Pirttinen.
On July 1, Snæfell signed Chandler Smith from Gonzaga University to replace Kristen McCarthy who was still recovering from a concussion she received in March 2019.
On July 8, Valur signed former KR point guard Kiana Johnson.
On July 9, Grindavík signed Icelandic national team player Bríet Sif Hinriksdóttir. Bríet played the previous season with Stjarnan where she averaged 13.4 points 4.3 rebounds per game and was named to the Úrvalsdeild Domestic All-First Team.
On August 23, it was reported that KR had signed Sanja Orozović who the previous season had averaged 20.6 points, 7.5 rebounds and 3.7 assists for Breiðablik.
On August 30, former Icelandic national team and Keflavík's player, Bryndís Guðmundsdóttir, announced her retirement from basketball.
On 8 September 2019, Benedikt Guðmundsson, the head coach of KR, confirmed that Margrét Kara Sturludóttir was training with the club with the possibility signing with the team. She last played for Stjarnan during the 2015–2016 season when she averaged 10.9 points, 12.5 rebounds and 4.1 assists per game.
On September 9, Skallagrímur announced the signing of Danish national team member Emilie Hesseldal. She played previously for Vitória S.C. and led the Portuguese Liga Feminina de Basquetebol in rebounds the previous two seasons.
On October 16, in a game between KR and Valur, Unnur Tara Jónsdóttir, who is a practicing medical doctor outside of basketball, was involved in a controversy with referee Ísak Ernir Kristinsson after she requested permission to enter the court during a stoppage to attend to a teammate who had been suffered a serious leg injury after a hard landing moments before. Ísak denied her the permission and gave her a technical foul after she indicated that she would then ask one of the other referees at the game for permission instead. After the incident caused an uproar with fans, the Icelandic Basketball Association Referee Committee issued a statement where it stated that Ísak admitted that it had been a mistake on his behalf to deny Unnur permission to attend to her injured teammate and that the Committee agreed with that assessment.
On January 10, Snæfell's forward Berglind Gunnarsdóttir was involved in a serious accident after a bus she was traveling with, along with more than 40 college students, slid of the road in icy conditions and landed upside down. In the accident, she suffered serious neck and spinal injuries, leaving her partially paralyzed.

References

External links
Official Icelandic Basketball Federation website

Icelandic
Lea
Úrvalsdeild kvenna seasons (basketball)